Outlawed is a 2021 novel by American writer Anna North.

Development and writing
The novel takes place in an alternate timeline where the United States experienced a devastating flu pandemic in the 1830s. Among other implications, this pandemic resulted in strict fertility laws. North read books such as Nell Painter's Exodusters to better understand the real-world history of the West before writing the novel.

Reception
The novel received mostly positive reviews. Maureen Corrigan, writing for NPR, praised the book as a "[...] smart adventure tale". Kirkus Reviews gave credit to the novel for "[...earning] its place in the growing canon of fiction that subverts the Western genre [...]".

Television adaptation 
On January 26, 2021, it was announced that Outlawed would be adapted for television by A24 and Amy Adams' Bond Group Entertainment.

References

2021 American novels
Western (genre) novels
Bloomsbury Publishing books
American alternate history novels